Shawna Cain is a Canadian performer of Christian music from Brampton, Ontario, whose 2020 EP The Way won the Juno Award for Contemporary Christian/Gospel Album of the Year at the Juno Awards of 2021.

Her style blends Christian music themes with contemporary rhythm and blues and hip hop influences.

References

External links

21st-century Black Canadian women singers
Canadian performers of Christian music
Canadian rhythm and blues singers
Musicians from Brampton
Juno Award for Contemporary Christian/Gospel Album of the Year winners
Living people
Year of birth missing (living people)